San Miguel High School may refer to either of the following:
San Miguel High School in Tucson, Arizona, United States
San Miguel National High School (formerly San Miguel High School) in San Miguel, Bulacan, Philippines